Francisco Ernandi Lima da Silva (born 2 July 1959 in Brasilia), better known as Mirandinha, is a Brazilian former professional footballer who played as a striker.

Club career 
He had unsuccessful early spells at Ceará and Fortaleza, before finding some success at the 'third club' in Fortaleza city, Ferroviário. He then moved to play for Ponte Preta. As of 1981 he was playing for Botafogo in the Taça de Ouro.

Mirandinha signed for Newcastle United in 1987 for £575,000, becoming the first Brazilian to play in English football. He made his debut in September 1987, in a 1–1 draw away to Norwich City. He left Newcastle in 1989, returning to his former club Palmeiras.

In 1991, he moved from Palmeiras to join Belenenses, although he was only there for a short time, playing three Portuguese League matches. By late February he was playing for Corinthians, and he scored two goals for them in the 1991 Copa Libertadores.

After leaving Corinthians he played for Fortaleza, and he then had spells in Japan with Shimizu S-Pulse and Shonan Bellmare.

International career 
Mirandinha won four caps for the Brazil national team, all in 1987, with his only international goal coming against England in a 1–1 draw during the 1987 Rous Cup.

Post-playing career 
As of July 2013 he was a director at Maguary, who were playing in the third division of the Campeonato Cearense. In 2014 he was the manager of the Castelão stadium in Fortaleza, a host venue in the 2014 FIFA World Cup.

Club statistics

A.  Two appearances and one goal in Simod Cup included in total.
B.  One appearance in Simod Cup and one appearance in Mercantile Credit Centenary Trophy included in total.

References

External links
 
 
 

1959 births
Living people
Brazilian footballers
Brazilian expatriate footballers
Brazil international footballers
1987 Copa América players
Campeonato Brasileiro Série A players
Primeira Liga players
English Football League players
J1 League players
Japan Football League (1992–1998) players
Expatriate footballers in England
Expatriate footballers in Portugal
Expatriate footballers in Japan
Brazilian football managers
Associação Atlética Ponte Preta players
Sociedade Esportiva Palmeiras players
Botafogo de Futebol e Regatas players
Clube Náutico Capibaribe players
Associação Portuguesa de Desportos players
Newcastle United F.C. players
C.F. Os Belenenses players
Sport Club Corinthians Paulista players
Fortaleza Esporte Clube players
Shimizu S-Pulse players
Shonan Bellmare players
Ferroviário Atlético Clube (CE) managers
Hajer Club managers
Goiânia Esporte Clube managers
Atlético Rio Negro Clube managers
Al-Raed FC managers
Nacional Futebol Clube managers
Esporte Clube Flamengo managers
Fortaleza Esporte Clube managers
Parnahyba Sport Club managers
Ríver Atlético Clube managers
Expatriate football managers in Sudan
Association football forwards
Sportspeople from Ceará